Coplin may refer to:

People
 Amber Lynn Coplin, American murder victim
 Amanda Coplin, American novelist
 Bill Coplin, American professor

Places
 Coplin Plantation, Maine, United States, a census-designated place

See also
 Caplin (disambiguation)